Nikola Dedović (born 25 January 1992) is a Serbian water polo player for Spandau 04. He was a member of the Serbia men's national water polo team that won a gold medal at the 2020 Summer Olympics.

References

External links
 

1992 births
Living people
Sportspeople from Belgrade
Water polo players at the 2020 Summer Olympics
Serbian male water polo players
Olympic gold medalists for Serbia in water polo
Medalists at the 2020 Summer Olympics